The Girl Can Help It is a studio album by Australian singer Kate Ceberano. The album was dedicated to L. Ron Hubbard, the author and founder of the Church of Scientology.

Background
Following the release of her 1999 best of album True Romantic, Ceberano has moved to the United States. In 2002, she discovered she was pregnant with her first child and wanted to move back to Melbourne. In her 2014 autobiography, Ceberano says she started recording the album in May 2003 and was eager to finish the album and tour before the baby was due in December.

Ceberano launched the album with a series of live shows, where she sang and played the piano live for the first time.

Track listing
 
 
 Enhanced CD includes "Yes" music video directed and produced by Lee Rogers.

References

Kate Ceberano albums
2003 albums